Kasbah of Beni Mellal is a historical monument in Beni Mellal, Morocco. It is a classified monument by the Moroccan Ministry of Culture.

The name 
The Kasbah is also named Kasbah or Borj Ras el Ain instead of Beni Mellal.

History 

The Kasbah is located on the top of a mountain next to Ain Asserdoune which provides a view over the city of Beni Mellal. 

It was first built by the Alaouite Sultan Moulay Ismail to protect the city from invaders.

Gallery

References 

Beni Mellal
Buildings and structures in Béni Mellal-Khénifra
Kasbahs in Morocco